Wa-Tu-Wa-Zui (Beautiful People) is an album by organist Charles Kynard which was recorded in 1970 and released on the Prestige label.

Reception

Richie Unterberger of Allmusic called it "a solid album that occasionally catches fire".

Track listing 
 "Wa-Tu-Wa-Zui (Beautiful People)" (Richard Fritz) - 7:50   
 "Winter's Child" (Fritz) - 4:33   
 "Zebra Walk" (Kynard) - 6:10   
 "Something" (George Harrison) - 9:40   
 "Change Up" (Kynard) - 9:00

Personnel 
Charles Kynard - organ, electric piano
Virgil Jones - trumpet
Rusty Bryant - tenor saxophone
Melvin Sparks - guitar
Jimmy Lewis - electric bass
Idris Muhammad (tracks 1-3 & 5), Bernard Purdie (track 4) - drums
Richard Fritz - arranger (tracks 1 & 2)

References 

Charles Kynard albums
1971 albums
Prestige Records albums
Albums produced by Bob Porter (record producer)
Albums recorded at Van Gelder Studio